Ryan Berman (born October 1980) is an American attorney and politician serving as a member of Michigan House of Representatives from district 39. Elected in November 2018, he assumed office on January 1, 2019.

Early life and education 
A native of West Bloomfield, Michigan, Berman graduated from Detroit Country Day School. He earned a Bachelor of Arts degree in psychology from Michigan State University in 2002 and a Juris Doctor from the Wayne State University Law School in 2004.

Career 
In 2005, Berman became an attorney. He served as a special prosecutor in the Palm Beach County, Florida State Attorney's Office in 2009 and later worked as the general counsel for Inergi LP. On November 6, 2018, Berman won the election and became a Republican member of Michigan House of Representatives for district 39.

In August 2021, Berman declared his candidacy for Michigan attorney general in the 2022 election.

Personal life 
Berman and his wife, Stacie, have two children. He lives in Commerce Township, Michigan.

References

External links 
 Ryan Berman at ballotpedia.org
 Ryan Berman at michiganvotes.org
 Ryan Berman, District 39 at gophouse.gov
 Names you'll see on Michigan primary ballots in August 2018

1980 births
21st-century American politicians
Detroit Country Day School alumni
Living people
Republican Party members of the Michigan House of Representatives
Michigan State University alumni
People from Farmington, Michigan
Wayne State University alumni